Aadi Perukku (also spelt Aadipperukku) is a 1962 Indian Tamil-language romance film edited and directed by K. Shankar. The film stars Gemini Ganesan, B. Saroja Devi and Devika, while M. V. Rajamma and K. D. Santhanam play supporting roles. It was released on 2 August 1962, and failed at the box office.

Plot 

Padma lives with her widowed mother and her brother, a harbour worker. The family finds refuge in the house of Raja, a poet. Padma's brother dies in an accident.

Cast 

Male cast
 Gemini Ganesh as Raja & Philanthropist Krishnan
 Chandrababu as Biscuit
 K. D. Santhanam as Ramalingam
 P. D. Sambandam as Koithan Pillai
 Karikol Raju
 G. K. Pillai
 S. G. Eswaran as Sivanandam
 C. V. V. Panthulu as Well wisher
 Mahalingam as Sundaram
 R. Shankaran
 Gemini Balu
 Wahab Kashmiri

Female cast
 B. Saroja Devi as Padma
 Devika as Latha
 M. V. Rajamma as Parvathi
 K. V. Shanthi as Thangam
 C. K. Saraswathi as Mangalam
 Vidyavathi as Principal
 Devaki as Female Beggar
Supporting cast
 G. V. Sharma, V. P. Natarajan

Production 
The film shares its name with Aadi Perukku, a festival in Tamil Nadu which pays tribute to water's life-sustaining properties. Despite that, the festival is not referenced anywhere onscreen except the song "Annaiyin Arule Vaa", near the end of which Gemini Ganesan's character is shown singing the last two lines as a tribute to the festival. Shooting took place at the now non-existent Majestic Studios.

Soundtrack 
The soundtrack was composed by A. M. Rajah, with lyrics written by Kothamangalam Subbu, Kannadasan, K. D. Santhanam and Suratha.

Release and reception 
Aadi Perukku was released on 2 August 1962. On 10 August, The Indian Express called it "another insipid medley of romance, comedy and melodrama [...] A story of unfulfilled love, the film is heavily padded with the usual quantum of songs, dances and other box office gimmicks." The reviewer however praised the performances of the cast members. Kanthan of Kalki lauded Saroja Devi's performance, but said she was the only reason to watch the film just once. According to historian Randor Guy, the film did not succeed commercially because of the "somewhat predictable storyline, the many deaths and the lack of significance of the title".

References

External links 
 

1960s romance films
1960s Tamil-language films
1962 films
Films directed by K. Shankar
Films with screenplays by Javar Seetharaman
Indian black-and-white films
Indian romance films